The 1967–68 Taça de Portugal was the 28th edition of the Portuguese football knockout tournament, organized by the Portuguese Football Federation (FPF). The 1967–68 Taça de Portugal began on 8 October 1967. The final was played on 16 June 1968 at the Estádio Nacional.

Vitória de Setúbal were the previous holders, having defeated Académica de Coimbra 3–2 in the previous season's final. Defending champions Vitória de Setúbal were unable to regain the Taça de Portugal as they were defeated in the final by Porto who claimed their third Taça de Portugal.

First round
Ties were played between the 8–15 October. Cup ties which ended in a tied aggregate score were replayed at a later date. Teams from the Primeira Liga (I) and the Portuguese Second Division (II) entered at this stage.

|}

Second round
Ties were played between the 21–31 January. Due to the odd number of teams involved at this stage of the competition, Benfica qualified for the next round due to having no opponent to face at this stage of the competition.

|}

Third round
Ties were played between the 17–24 May. Club sides Lusitânia and Marítimo as well as the Angolan, Bissau-Guinean and Mozambican national teams were invited to participate in the competition.

|}

Quarter-finals
Ties were played on the 19–26 May.

|}

Semi-finals
Ties were played between the 2–9 June.

|}

Final

References

Taça de Portugal seasons
1967–68 domestic association football cups
Taça